Dujon is a surname and male given name. Notable people with this name include:

 Bernard Dujon (born 1947), French geneticist
 Dujon Sterling (born 1999), English football player
 Jeff Dujon (born 1956), West Indian cricket player
 Leroy Dujon (1918–1967), Jamaican cricket player